The 2nd Global Indian Film Awards (2006) were presented in Kuala Lumpur, Malaysia.

Background
The entire event was organised by Suniel Shetty's Popcorn Entertainment and One Big Option between 7 and 9 December 2006. The previous awards ceremony was held in Dubai, United Arab Emirates. The members of jury were Jackie Shroff, Rati Agnihotri, Sajid Nadiadwala, Sandeep Chowta, Shyam Benegal, and Smita Thackeray. Batuk Seri Tengku Adnan Tengku Mansor, the tourism minister of Malaysia, launched the awards on 9 May 2006. Initially, the function was scheduled to run from 30 August to 2 September 2006.

Events
Baabul was screened at a cinema hall in Kuala Lumpur City Centre. The promo of Shootout at Lokhandwala, directed by Apoorva Lakhia, screened to positive responses, especially from Shah Rukh Khan and Jeetendra. Showreels of Dus Kahaniyaan and Woodstock Villa were also shown. Music launch for the film I See You was held at a Provogue-sponsored fashion show. A football match between Bollywood actors and Malaysian ministers was also conducted. Costumes auctioned included Salman Khan's jacket, Hema Malini's sari, Amitabh Bachchan's coat, Rani Mukherjee's sari and John Abraham's costumes worn for Baabul.

Award ceremony and reception
Shah Rukh Khan, Salman Khan, Abhishek Bachchan, Priyanka Chopra, Katrina Kaif and Ameesha Patel performed at the awards ceremony hosted by Arshad Warsi, Amrita Arora, Minissha Lamba, Arbaaz Khan and Arjun Rampal. An estimated audience of 4,000 was present at the awards ceremony, including Malaysian prime minister Abdullah Badawi, Malaysian queen and deputy premier Najib Tun Razak. Kaif was awarded the title of Most Beautiful Lips.

A commentator writing for the Mumbai Mirror accused the organisers for giving "preferential treatment" and mismanagement. One of the jury members Jackie Shroff, was reportedly on a vacation in the Indian state of Goa and was unaware of the event while it was being conducted. Filmmaker Sanjay Gupta, however, defended the organisers, saying "Those who drive Fiats were given Mercs. And still they're grumbling!". Film journalist Bharati S. Pradhan wrote in The Telegraph that the awards ceremony was a "baggy, poorly-arranged show by all accounts" and the reason Gupta was defending the organisers was that he had close relations with them.

Nominees and winners

References

Global Indian Film Awards
2006 film awards
Bollywood film awards